HD 73256 is a variable star in the southern constellation of Pyxis. It has the variable star designation CS Pyxidis. With a baseline apparent visual magnitude of 8.08, it requires a small telescope to view. The star is located at a distance of 120 light years from the Sun based on parallax, and is drifting further away with a radial velocity of +30 km/s.

The stellar classification of this star is G8IV-VFe+0.5, which suggests a slightly evolved G-type main-sequence star with a mild overabundance of iron in the spectrum. It is a BY Draconis variable with a period of 13.97 days, showing a variation of 0.03 in magnitude due to chromospheric activity. The star appears overluminous for its class, which may be the result of a high metallicity. The star has roughly the same mass and a slightly smaller radius as the Sun, but is radiating 74% of the Sun's luminosity. It is around 2–3 billion years old and is spinning with a projected rotational velocity of 3.2 km/s.

In 2003, S. Udry and colleagues reported the discovery of a planet in orbit around HD 73256 using data from the CORALIE spectrograph. This object is a Hot Jupiter with at least 1.87 times the mass of Jupiter in an orbit with a period of 2.55 days. Assuming the planet is perfectly grey with no greenhouse or tidal effects, and a Bond albedo of 0.1, the temperature would be about 1300 K. This is close to 51 Pegasi b; between the predicted temperatures of HD 189733 b and HD 209458 b (1180-1392K), before they were measured. It is a candidate for "near-infrared characterisation with the VLTI Spectro-Imager".

In 2018, K. Ment and colleagues reported an attempt to confirm the existence of this planet using Keck/HIRES data, but were unable to do so despite a likelihood of success. Thus the existence of this object is disputed.

See also 
 HD 72659
 List of extrasolar planets

References

G-type main-sequence stars
G-type subgiants
Hypothetical planetary systems
BY Draconis variables

Pyxis (constellation)
Durchmusterung objects
073256
042214
Pyxidis, CS